Mark Graham (born 13 March 1973), is a former Australian rules football player who played with Hawthorn for over a decade before finishing his career at Richmond. He was a left-footed defender and possessed a strong overhead mark. In 2001, he finished second in the Hawk's best and fairest. Mark's last game against his former club Hawthorn was a memorable one, coming from behind in the last minutes of the game, the Tigers defeated the Hawks.

External links

1973 births
Australian rules footballers from Victoria (Australia)
Hawthorn Football Club players
Richmond Football Club players
Living people